Culwell is a surname. Notable people with the surname include:

Alex Culwell (born 1994), American soccer player
Ben Culwell (1918–1992), American painter
Ryan Culwell (born 1980), American singer, songwriter, and guitarist

See also
Calwell
Colwell (surname)